The Birmingham Independent School of Performing Arts (BISPA) was a private foundation school In Birmingham, England. The School was based at the Old Fire Station in Birmingham which was established in 1912. In 2004 the building was converted into BISPA.

External links

Defunct schools in Birmingham, West Midlands